Richard Lloyd (18 February 1945 – 30 March 2008) was a British racing car driver and founder of multiple sports car and touring car teams.  He drove in multiple championships himself, including the British Saloon Car Championship and the World Endurance Championship.

Life and career

Initially Lloyd worked for Decca Records from 1964 to 1970, during which time he became interested in racing after competing in a Triumph TR4A during 1967.  He later formed his own public relations business, Motor Race Relations, in 1971, while continuing his own driving duties, during which time he won multiple events in the British Saloon Car Championship. He went on to form GTi Engineering in 1978, running Volkswagen Golf GTIs and Audi 80s. This team eventually became Richard Lloyd Racing in 1985 as Lloyd moved into the World Sportscar Championship with Porsche 956s and 962s.

Following the demise of the team in 1990, Richard Lloyd returned to racing, driving, and winning, in the Porsche 924 Championship.  In 1995, he established Audi Sport UK to once again compete in the British Touring Car Championship, with support from the Audi factory.  Lloyd re-entered sports car racing in 1999 with the Audi R8C program at the 24 Hours of Le Mans, before being chosen by Audi's fellow Volkswagen Group subsidiary, Bentley, to run the EXP Speed 8 program in 2001.

Audi Sport UK was renamed Apex Motorsport during their Bentley tenure, subsequently became Jaguar's development team for the XKR in the FIA GT3 European Championship.  Lloyd stopped racing professionally in the 1990s, but continued to run in historic racing events up until his death.

Death

Lloyd died on 30 March 2008, when a private jet on which he was travelling crashed into a house in Farnborough, London, shortly after take-off from Biggin Hill Airport. All five occupants died upon impact; among them were an Apex Motorsport Data Engineer, Christopher Allarton, and former British Touring Car Championship driver David Leslie.  Both were en route with Lloyd to the Nogaro Circuit in France to prepare Apex Motorsport's Jaguar for the upcoming FIA GT3 season.

The investigation into the crash found that a combination of incorrectly identified, non-critical system failures led to the in-flight shut-down of both engines, with the crew unable to restart them in time to avoid the impact.

Racing record

Complete British Saloon Car Championship results
(key) (Races in bold indicate pole position; races in italics indicate fastest lap.)

† Events with 2 races staged for the different classes.

24 Hours of Le Mans results

References

External links
 British Racing Drivers' Club - Richard Lloyd

1945 births
2008 deaths
British Touring Car Championship drivers
English racing drivers
24 Hours of Le Mans drivers
World Sportscar Championship drivers
Sports car racing team owners
Victims of aviation accidents or incidents in England
Victims of aviation accidents or incidents in 2008
Porsche Motorsports drivers